The Hunter Valley Railway Trust (HVRT) is a collection of items located in North Rothbury it is not open to the public, New South Wales, Australia on the site of the Rothbury Riot. It includes various types of rolling stock, such as coal and freight wagons and passenger coaches, and a variety of ex-New South Wales Government Railways locomotives. It also included seven of the fourteen heritage-listed South Maitland Railways 10 Class locomotives, until they were sold.

South Maitland Railway 10 class locomotives
 SMR 17 – In covered storage, in black livery.
 SMR 20 – In covered storage, in black livery. Locomotive was operational in the 1990s but boiler ticket has since expired
 SMR 23 – The loco was dismantled while at Rothbury, in blue livery . The dismantled pieces have now been moved to Dorrigo.
 SMR 26 – In covered storage, in black livery.
 SMR 27 – In covered storage, in black livery. The side tanks and boiler were swapped to restore SMR 10.
 SMR 28 – In covered storage, in black livery.
 SMR 31 – In open storage, in green livery
In April 2013 these seven locomotives were sold to the Dorrigo Steam Railway & Museum.

Other locomotives
 R766 – an ex Victorian Railways locomotive, that is being overhauled including conversion to standard gauge owned by a syndicate based in Victoria.

Gallery

References

City of Cessnock
Museums in New South Wales
Rail transport in the Hunter Region
Railway museums in New South Wales